Cystophora may refer to:
 Cystophora (alga): a brown algae genus in the family Sargassaceae
 Cystophora (mammal): the hooded seal